Jean-Luc Stéphane Reichmann (born 2 November 1960 in Fontainebleau) is a French radio and television host. He started a career on radio in 1989, then became TV presenter in 1995 and tried a career as actor since 2008. He is now particularly known for his daily show Les douze coups de midi, broadcast at 12:00 pm on TF1. He has six children.

Voice-over
 1989-1999 : Les Guignols de l'info, Canal+
 1991-1994 : Que le meilleur gagne and N'oubliez pas votre brosse à dents, France 2
 The Price Is Right, TF1
 Porco Rosso (animated feature ) : Curtis
 Tribunal (series)
 Motus, France 2
 Ma voyante préférée (series)

TV shows
 Le Trophée Campus, France 2
 1995-2000 : Les Z'amours, France 2
 1998 : Jeux sans frontières, France 2
 1999 : Les Forges du désert, France 2
 Since 2001 : Attention à la marche, TF1
 Since 2007 : Phénoménal, TF1
 2009 : Identity, TF1
 2010 : Les douze coups de midi, TF1
 2014 : Au pied du mur!, TF1

TV films
 2008 : Le monde est petit, TF1
 2010 : Joséphine, ange gardien TV Series (1 Episode : "Ennemis jurés")
 2011 : Victor Sauvage, TF1

References

1960 births
Living people
French people of Jewish descent
French radio presenters
French television presenters
Mass media people from Toulouse
French people of Slovak descent